Godwin Attram (born 7 August 1980) is a Ghanaian former professional footballer who played as a forward.

Club career
Godwin began his career with home-based club Great Olympics in 1996. In 1998, he moved to Dutch club PSV Eindhoven but did not feature in a single match. He was then transferred on loan to Danish club Silkeborg IF where he played a total of 31 matches scoring 5 goals.

After an unsuccessful time in Netherlands, he signed a contract with Tunisian club Stade Tunisien.

He then moved to Saudi Arabia where he played for giants Al-Shabab and scored 47 goals in a total of three seasons. He also won the top-scorer award in 2006–07 season for scoring 13 goals. He spent a brief period with Al-Hazm in 2008 scoring 4 goals.

In 2008, he moved to UAE based club Al-Shaab and scored 13 goals in 2008-09 season. Then he moved to Hatta Club in 2009. In 2010, he signed a contract with Alexandria based club Smouha. He stayed there for two seasons scoring 11 goals. In 2012, he came back to Saudi Arabia and featured for Hajer in fourteen matches. He scored the first and the only goal for the Al-Hasa based club against the Asian giants Al-Hilal FC. On 10 September 2013, he signed a contract with Oman Professional League club  Dhofar S.C.S.C.

International career
He represented the Ghana national football team in 2006 African Cup of Nations wearing the number 12 jersey. He played in ten international matches and scored one goal for the national team.

Coaching career 
Attram founded along Piet de Visser in the Spring 2010, the Football Academy Attram De Visser Soccer Academy based in Sowutuom. In January 2020, he was appointed as the assistant coach to Ibrahim Tanko for the Ghana A' national football team. After serving in that role for 5 months, in April 2020 he was moved to the Ghana national under-23 football team to serve as the assistant coach along with Yusif Basigi to Paa Kwesi Fabin.

Honours

Club 
Silkeborg IF

 Danish Cup: 2000–01

Stade Tunisien

 Tunisian League Cup: 2002

Al-Shabab

 Saudi Premier League: 2003–04, 2005–06

International 

 FIFA U-17 World Championship runner up: 1997

Individual
Saudi Professional League-Top Scorer : 2003–04, 2006–07

References

External links 

 Sports Check with Godwin Attram

Living people
1980 births
Association football forwards
Ghanaian footballers
Ghana international footballers
2006 Africa Cup of Nations players
Silkeborg IF players
Accra Great Olympics F.C. players
PSV Eindhoven players
Al-Shabab FC (Riyadh) players
Al-Hazem F.C. players
Al-Shaab CSC players
Hajer FC players
Dhofar Club players
Al-Shahania SC players
UAE Pro League players
Saudi Professional League players
Qatari Second Division players
Ghanaian expatriate sportspeople in Tunisia
Ghanaian expatriates in Saudi Arabia
Expatriate footballers in Oman
Accra Great Olympics F.C. managers